Podlubovo is a rural locality (a selo) and the administrative centre of Podlubovsky Selsoviet, Karmaskalinsky District, Bashkortostan, Russia. The population was 905 in 2010. There are eight streets.

Geography 
Yakty-Kul is the nearest rural locality.

References 

Rural localities in Karmaskalinsky District